Education in the Falkland Islands is free and compulsory up to the end of the academic year when a child reaches 16 years of age. The Falklands follows the English education system.

Primary and secondary education
There are two schools in Stanley, the capital and only substantial settlement. The Infant and Junior School teaches ages 4 to 11 and the Falkland Islands Community School caters for ages 11 to 16. Other rural pupils are taught by travelling teachers. Older children can board in a hostel in Stanley so they can attend school there.

All teachers are trained in the UK or other English-speaking countries. There is also a primary school at RAF Mount Pleasant that mainly serves the children of members of the British armed forces. Some primary aged children who live in "camp" (the local term for the countryside) are educated remotely. In 2021 this Camp Education system celebrated its 125th anniversary.

Post-16 education

There are no post-secondary institutions on the Falklands, and therefore post-secondary studies would require travel to the UK or beyond. The Falkland Islands Government pays for qualified 16- to 18-year-olds to go to England to take A-level courses at Peter Symonds College, Winchester, England (which houses a Falkland Islands funded boarding house named Falkland Lodge) or to attend Chichester College to acquire National Diplomas or NVQs. The FIG pays for each student to board at Peter Symonds if they achieve at least five "C" grades in GCSEs. Therefore in 2005 principal Neil Hopkins described the college as "the official sixth-form college for the Falkland Islands".

The government also funds higher and further education courses for over-18s, also usually in the UK, for suitably qualified students.

Almost all return to the Falkland Islands after they have completed their education and gained experience in their chosen field.

Adult education
There is a small adult education college and training centre in Stanley, called Falkland College. It moved into a new building during 2020. It offers vocational courses, including via distance learning. The college includes a library called the Christie Community Library.

References

External links
 Falkland Islands Government education page
Falkland Islands Primary Education website for Infant and Junior School and also Camp Education
Falkland Islands Community School, Stanley
Mount Pleasant Primary School, Mount Pleasant Complex
Peter Symonds College, the UK sixth-form college for Falkland Students

 
Society of the Falkland Islands